José Eduardo Rosa Vale de Castro (born 13 January 1983), commonly known as Zé Castro, is a Portuguese former footballer who played as a central defender.

He started and finished his professional career with Académica, but spent 11 years in Spain representing Atlético Madrid, Deportivo and Rayo Vallecano. Appearing for all the clubs in La Liga, he amassed totals of 168 matches and five goals.

Castro earned 26 caps for Portugal at youth level, including 15 for the under-21 team. He made his full debut in 2009.

Club career

Académica
Born in Coimbra, Castro entered hometown Académica de Coimbra's youth ranks as a child, and made his Primeira Liga debut on 5 October 2003, playing the full 90 minutes in a 4–1 away loss to FC Porto. Despite his young age, he eventually became an undisputed starter and team captain.

Atlético Madrid
In May 2006, after unfinished advances by Portugal's Big Three, Castro signed with Spanish club Atlético Madrid on a free transfer alongside compatriot Costinha. In his first year he benefitted from injuries to teammates, appearing in 22 La Liga matches and scoring two goals (including an 83rd-minute strike against CA Osasuna for the game's only goal, at home, on 20 January 2007). He featured rarely in the following season.

Deportivo
In the summer of 2008, Castro joined fellow league side Deportivo de La Coruña on a season-long loan, with the Galicians having a buyout clause of €2 million for 50% of the player's rights; the remaining 50% were owned by a company. Again due to injury – habitual starter Pablo Amo was sidelined for months with an Achilles tendon problem – the Portuguese was able to start most of the campaign, and the option was activated for a permanent move.

Castro played only ten games in 2009–10, and featured even less the following season, prompting him to request a move in mid-November 2010. In March 2011, he was to be picked as a last-minute substitute for a league match against Real Sociedad after Aythami Artiles went down with a bout of gastroenteritis, but did not present himself at the Estadio Riazor and could not be traced through his mobile phone.

Later years
Following Depors two relegations in the space of three seasons, and a promotion in between, Castro returned to both Madrid and the Spanish top flight on 29 August 2013, signing a one-year deal at Rayo Vallecano. In early July 2015, the 32-year-old extended that by a further three.

Castro returned to Académica on 25 September 2017, after an absence of 11 years. In April 2022, after the club confirmed its first-ever relegation to the third division, he announced his retirement, saying of Portuguese football "We are very ignorant, football-wise. We aren't illiterate, illiteracy is not being able to learn. If you can learn but don't want to, you're ignorant".

International career
Shortly after his debut with Académica, Castro became a defensive stalwart for the Portugal under-21s, and appeared at the 2006 UEFA European Championship on home soil. There, he played three complete matches as the team exited in the group stage, and scored an own goal in the 2–0 defeat against Serbia.

On 10 June 2009, Castro finally made his full debut, in a 0–0 friendly draw in Estonia. On 10 May of the following year, in spite of a poor season at Deportivo, he was included in a provisional squad of 24 players announced by Carlos Queiroz in view of the 2010 FIFA World Cup; however, after Pepe recovered in time to participate in the competition, he was cut.

Career statistics

Club

International

Honours
Deportivo
UEFA Intertoto Cup: 2008
Segunda División: 2011–12

References

External links

1983 births
Living people
Sportspeople from Coimbra
Portuguese footballers
Association football defenders
Primeira Liga players
Liga Portugal 2 players
Segunda Divisão players
Associação Académica de Coimbra – O.A.F. players
La Liga players
Segunda División players
Atlético Madrid footballers
Deportivo de La Coruña players
Rayo Vallecano players
Portugal youth international footballers
Portugal under-21 international footballers
Portugal B international footballers
Portugal international footballers
Portuguese expatriate footballers
Expatriate footballers in Spain
Portuguese expatriate sportspeople in Spain